Boleigh Fogou is a fogou near St. Buryan in Cornwall. It can be reached via the B3315 Penzance to Land's End road near The Pipers standing stones. Iron Age pottery was found at the fogou along with carvings that may have been brought from elsewhere. It is unusual in structure as it has more than one entranceway.

The Boleigh fogou was the subject of a 1996 episode of Channel 4's Time Team.

Notes

External links

 available to watch free of charge

Archaeological sites in Cornwall
Fogous